Thomas Fabbiano and Boris Pašanski won the doubles competition in 2008.
Fabbiano teamed up with Matteo Marrai, but they were eliminated by Philipp Marx and Rogier Wassen already in the first round.
Alessio di Mauro and Simone Vagnozzi won in the final 6–4, 3–6, [10–4], against Yves Allegro and Jesse Huta Galung.

Seeds

Draw

Draw

References
 Doubles Draw

Antonio Savoldi-Marco Co - Trofeo Dimmidisi - Doubles
Antonio Savoldi–Marco Cò – Trofeo Dimmidisì